John C. Cushman III is an American real estate executive.  He is the chairman of global transactions and chairman of the board of Cushman & Wakefield, a global real estate services firm founded by his grandfather, J. Clydesdale Cushman and great-uncle, Bernard Wakefield.

Additionally, John holds directorships at Callaway Golf Company, iCRETE LLC (Co-Chairman) and ARTOC Universal Properties (Co-Chairman) in Cairo, Egypt. He also serves as Chairman of Rock Creek Management LLC and Chairman and Director of Zaca Mesa Winery in Santa Barbara County, California, which he co-founded.

Family
Cushman & Wakefield is a real estate services firm founded by his grandfather John Clydesdale Cushman and his great uncle Bernard Wakefield.

Career

In 1963, Cushman III joined Cushman & Wakefield Inc. in New York, New York after graduating from Colgate University. In 1967, he opened an office for Cushman  & Wakefield in Los Angeles. On April 1, 1978, he and his twin brother, Louis B. Cushman, left Cushman & Wakefield to form Cushman Realty Corporation.

In 2001, the Cushman Realty Corporation merged with Cushman & Wakefield, after which Cushman III became the chairman of Cushman & Wakefield.

On September 19, 2007, Mr. Cushman received The Hundred Year Association of New York's Gold Medal "in recognition of outstanding contributions to the City of New York".

Other work

Cushman has served as National president of the Boy Scouts of America and is a member of the National Executive Board of the Boy Scouts of America. 

He was a commissioner of the California Commission for Jobs and Economic Growth, a board member of the California Region I Homeland Security Advisory Council, and a trustee of the Urban Land Institute. He served on the boards of The Real Estate Roundtable; Town Hall and the World Affairs Council of Los Angeles; the Institute of International Education, New York City; the University of Southern California’s LUSK Center for Real Estate; Colgate University, Hamilton, New York; University of Colorado Boulder Business School; Fellows of Claremont University Center; and the National Park Foundation. 

Cushman is a Director and Chairman of Cushman Winery Corporation and owns Zaca Mesa Winery. Cushman has also served on the boards of Callaway Golf Company, Culinary Holdings, Inc., Cushman & Wakefield, Inc., D.A. Cushman Realty Corporation, Inglewood Park Cemetery, La Quinta Corporation, and La Quinta Properties, Inc.

Political activity

In 2015, Cushman donated $300,000 to Right to Rise, a Super PAC supporting Jeb Bush's presidential candidacy.

See also
Cushman & Wakefield

References

External links
 California Commission for Jobs and Economic Growth
 John C. Cushman III Is New BSA President

Living people
American real estate businesspeople
National Executive Board of the Boy Scouts of America members
Presidents of the Boy Scouts of America
1941 births